The Snapper card is a contactless electronic ticketing card used to pay for bus fares in Wellington, New Zealand. It was introduced in Wellington in July 2008. Another version – the Snapper HOP card – was introduced to Auckland in 2011 and withdrawn from Auckland in late 2013. Snapper CityLink cards were introduced in Whangarei in March 2014 and withdrawn in September 2018. It was owned by Snapper Services Limited, a former subsidiary of Infratil until 2019 when it was sold to ICM Limited, a subsidiary of Allectus Capital.

It can be used on Metlink branded buses and Runcimans buses in the greater Wellington area, as well as at participating shops and taxi services.
Further functions for the card are planned, for example, as a loyalty card.

Technology 
Snapper is a contactless smart card based on Infineon and SmartMX (from NXP Semiconductors) chip sets. It uses the Triple DES cryptographic system, which is standard in financial cards and has been approved in New Zealand as a secure mechanism for connection through to the EFTPOS network. The Snapper system is an adaptation of the T-money system used in South Korea.

On 3 May 2012, Snapper and 2degrees mobile announced the launch of a service that allows customers with a compatible NFC phone to make payments in all Snapper merchants using their mobile phone. The first phone to support this service is the LG Optimus Net. This service requires compatible NFC phone and a special SIM card with the snapper secure element included.

The bus-ticketing system is based on a "tag-on", "tag-off" principle, providing valuable data for transport authorities to analyse – and plan for – travel behaviour. Some users have been concerned by the privacy of such practises.

There are 2 different types of cards; a red card for adults, and a green card for school-aged children, which comes pre-loaded with a child concession.

Services

Buses
GO Wellington buses were the first to use Snapper cards, with "tag on/off" card readers inside the bus entrance and exit doors. It was trialled by 200 users on route 17 to Karori. From 1 June 2009 there is a 20% discount on standard fares for adults using a Snapper. Previously, this discount was 25%. Snapper was made available on Valley Flyer buses from 14 June 2009, and on Runcimans school buses in September later that year. As of 2018 Snapper is available on Mana/Newlands Coach Services buses as the Metlink bus network had been unified under one style and one fare system.

On 1 December 2009, Snapper announced plans to enter the Auckland market, targeting coverage of 80% of public transport by Rugby World Cup 2011. Infratil, ANZ Bank New Zealand (then ANZ National Bank), Eyede, Unisys and Beca Group pitched Snapper to the Auckland Regional Transport Authority (ARTA), which had made public its intention to introduce smartcards on public transport in Auckland. Snapper released the so-called purple HOP card, which was used only on NZ Bus services (but no other Auckland bus company or service) in Auckland from March 2011 until late 2013. After Auckland Transport superseded ARTA in 2010, Thales Group was awarded the contract and Snapper was required to exit the Auckland market after failing to make their system compatible with Thales' system. Subsequently, the rollout of the AT HOP card for all Auckland bus, train and ferry services was completed by Auckland Transport by March 2014.

On 3 March 2014, the Northland Regional Council introduced Snapper cards for Whangarei's urban bus network, CityLink Whangarei. On 29 September 2019, Snapper cards were phased out for the Whangarei bus network, which was replaced with the Bee Card.

Trains
The Johnsonville Branch was the first line to adopt the Snapper card system for fare payments; from 14 November 2021. Commuters "tag" on and off at card readers located on the station platform; the hardware and reader stands etc were installed from August. The system is a “trial” and will eventually replace paper tickets on other Wellington suburban lines.

Snapper cards will be used on the Kapiti Line from the 12th November 2022 and on the Hutt Valley Line, Melling Branch, and Wairarapa Connection from the 27th November 2022.

Ferries
Tickets for the East by West Ferry in Wellington could be purchased with Snapper cards at Queen's Wharf. Since early 2010, the Snapper card could be used to tag-on and tag-off the ferry, much like on buses, but there was no discount for using it on the ferry. Tag on-tag off services on the ferry have been discontinued. The old style card readers are there but they are covered up and disabled.

Retail stores
Many retailers in Wellington allowed Snapper as a form of payment, and facilitate topping up a Snapper card, these include FIX convenience stores, dairies and ticket offices throughout the Greater Wellington region.

In 2015, Snapper announced that, from 1 June, these contactless payments would no longer be available in stores and retail outlets (but may still be accented in some schools).

References

External links
Official website

Contactless smart cards
Fare collection systems in New Zealand
Public transport in the Wellington Region